Zvonko Stanojoski (Macedonian: Звонко Станојоски; born January 29, 1964, in Prilep) is a Macedonian chess Grandmaster. In 2007 he won the Open Championship of Macedonia with a score of 7.5/9, one point above Dragoljub Jacimovic. He achieved International Master status in 1999 and grandmaster status in 2004. On 30th of August 2015, he won Macedonian Championship once again.

Stanojoski played eight times for Macedonia in Chess Olympiads (1994–1998, 2002–2010).

References

External links 

1964 births
Living people
Chess grandmasters
Macedonian chess players